Harperley railway station served the Harperley Hall Estate and the nearby hamlet of Low Harperley, close to the village of Fir Tree in County Durham, North East England between 1861 and 1864 and again from 1892 to 1953 as a stop on the Wear Valley Line.

History 
However, because the station was built primarily to serve the Hall, it was located at the end of a private estate road with little public access and thus was closed in May 1864. A new, enlarged station, with sidings on either side of the tracks, was opened by the North Eastern Railway (NER) at Harperley on 1 November 1892 to serve a local ganister and timber contractor.

The line was double track through Harperley (to enable trains to pass) and this was controlled from a signal box, adjacent to the level crossing carrying the estate road across the line.

During WWII, a prisoner of war camp was constructed nearby, perhaps as a result of the remote location with good rail links.

The station was closed to passengers by British Railways (BR) on 29 June 1953 and goods on 1O October 1955, though goods traffic continued to pass through the station for some years. Though stopping goods trains had been withdrawn completely, the line was retained to serve the cement works and, in 1988, BR introduced a summer Sunday extension to the regular  to  'Heritage Line' service to Stanhope though no stop was provided at Harperley and the service was withdrawn after the summer of 1992 along with the freight on 17 March 1993.

Rather than close the line when freight traffic was withdrawn, BR mothballed it and a campaign began in 1993 to preserve the line as a heritage railway. However the organisation struggled financially and the service was suspended a short time later, not recommencing until August 2006.

After major efforts to clear the line of vegetation and repair damaged tracks, passenger services along the section between Stanhope and Bishop Auckland West through (but not stopping at) Harperley were reintroduced on 23 May 2010 and continued until the end of the 2012 season. However this service does not stop at Harperley and there do not currently appear to be any plans to reopen the station.

References

External links 

Disused railway stations in County Durham
Former North Eastern Railway (UK) stations
Railway stations in Great Britain opened in 1861
Railway stations in Great Britain opened in 1892
Railway stations in Great Britain closed in 1864
Railway stations in Great Britain closed in 1953
1861 establishments in England
1955 disestablishments in England
Wolsingham